WXCV (95.3 FM) is a radio station broadcasting a Top 40/CHR format.  Licensed to Homosassa Springs, Florida, United States, the station is owned by WXOF, Inc. and features programming from ABC Radio .

References

External links

XCV
Contemporary hit radio stations in the United States